Hill Aerospace Museum is a military aviation museum located at Hill Air Force Base in Roy, Utah. It is dedicated to the history of the base and aviation in Utah.

History
Preparations for a museum began in 1984, when ground was broken on an "Aerospace Park and Museum". The museum itself opened in 1987 in a World War II warehouse. In 1991, a new  administration building and  hangar were dedicated.

The museum recovered a number of aircraft wrecks, including a B-24, B-26, P-38, and P-40 from Alaska in the mid-1990s.

In 1996, the museum became the home of the Utah Aviation Hall of Fame. In 1997, it was alleged that seven years prior a number of artifacts and a C-131 were removed from the museum without authorization.

The museum grew again in 1999, when a second display hangar was opened as the Lindquist-Stewart Fighter Gallery. A mezzanine was added to the first hangar, now renamed the Hadley Gallery, the following year. An exhibit about Women Airforce Service Pilots was opened in 2004.

In 2014, the museum announced it would be removing 18 aircraft from its collection. Large scale repainting of the exterior display aircraft took place in 2015, with 5 airplanes and 2 missiles being affected. For the twentieth anniversary of its opening in 2016, the Utah Aviation Hall of Fame was renovated.

The museum completed the conversion of a C-130 fuselage into a classroom in 2019. The museum embarked on expansion in 2021, building a new restoration facility and receiving $12 million from the state for the construction of a third hangar. At the same time, it was forced to announce plans to demolish its World War II barracks as it was too deteriorated to repair. Ground was broken for the expansion in October 2022.

Facilities
The museum is also home to the Marc C. Reynolds Aerospace Center for Education, which is located inside a C-130 fuselage.

In addition to its collection of aircraft, the museum also houses the Major General Rex A. Hadley Research Library and Archives, which contains technical and historical information related to the aircraft on display.

Also onsite is the Col. Nathan H. Mazer Memorial Chapel.

Exhibits
The museum has a number of exhibits about aviators from Utah such as Brigadier General Leon C. Packer and former senator Jake Garn. Other subjects include nose art of the 509th Composite Group and the Eighth Air Force.

Collection

 Beechcraft C-45H Expeditor
 Bell TH-13F Sioux
 Bell HH-1H Iroquois
 Boeing B-17G Flying Fortress
 Boeing B-29 Superfortress
 Boeing B-52G Stratofortress
 Boeing KC-135E Stratotanker
 Boeing-Stearman PT-17 Kaydet
 Burgess Model F
 Cessna A-37 Dragonfly
 Cessna O-2A Skymaster
 Cessna U-3A
 Consolidated B-24D Liberator
 Convair C-131D Samaritan
 Convair T-29C
 Convair F-102A Delta Dagger
 Convair F-106A Delta Dart
 Curtiss JN-4D Jenny
 Curtiss P-40N Warhawk
 de Havilland Canada C-7B Caribou
 Douglas A-1E Skyraider
 Douglas A-26B Invader
 Douglas C-47B Skytrain
 Douglas C-54G Skymaster
 Douglas C-124C Globemaster II
 Fairchild C-119G Flying Boxcar
 Fairchild C-123K Provider
 Fairchild Republic A-10A Thunderbolt II
 General Atomics MQ-1B Predator
 General Dynamics F-16A Fighting Falcon
 General Dynamics F-16A Fighting Falcon
 General Dynamics F-16A Fighting Falcon
 General Dynamics F-111E Aardvark
 Kaman HH-43B Huskie
 Lockheed C-140B JetStar
 Lockheed F-104A Starfighter
 Lockheed F-117 Nighthawk
 Lockheed C-130E Hercules – fuselage only
 Lockheed NC-130B Hercules
 Lockheed P-38J Lightning
 Lockheed SR-71C Blackbird
 Lockheed T-33 – converted to resemble P-80
 Lockheed T-33A
 Martin RB-57A Canberra
 McDonnell F-101B Voodoo
 McDonnell Douglas F-4C Phantom II
 McDonnell Douglas F-4D Phantom II
 McDonnell Douglas F-15A Eagle
 McDonnell Douglas RF-4C Phantom II
 Mikoyan-Gurevich MiG-21F
 North American AT-6A Texan
 North American B-25N Mitchell
 North American F-86F Sabre
 North American F-86L Sabre
 North American F-100A Super Sabre
 North American P-51D Mustang
 North American T-28B Trojan
 North American T-39A Sabreliner
 North American Rockwell OV-10A Bronco
 Northrop F-5E Tiger II
 Northrop F-89H Scorpion
 Northrop GT-38A Talon
 Piasecki CH-21C Workhorse
 Piper L-4J Grasshopper
 PZL-Mielec Lim-5
 Republic F-84F Thunderstreak
 Republic F-84G Thunderjet
 Republic F-105D Thunderchief
 Republic F-105G Thunderchief
 Republic P-47D Thunderbolt
 Rockwell B-1B Lancer
 Ryan L-17 Navion
 Sikorsky CH-3E
 Sikorsky MH-53M Pave Low IV
 Vought YA-7F
 Vultee BT-13B Valiant

See also
Hill Air Force Base
List of aerospace museums

References

Footnotes

Notes

External links

 
 Museum web site on the Utah Education Network

Aerospace museums in Utah
Museums in Weber County, Utah
Military and war museums in Utah
Air force museums in the United States
1981 establishments in Utah
Buildings and structures in Weber County, Utah